Abdullah Al-Ammar (born 1 March 1994) is a Saudi Arabian professional footballer who currently plays for Damac.

External links

References

1994 births
Living people
Saudi Arabian footballers
Saudi Arabia youth international footballers
Al Hilal SFC players
Al-Fateh SC players
Ittihad FC players
Damac FC players
Saudi Professional League players
Association football fullbacks